Han Sang-Min  (Hangul: 한상민; Hanja: 韓相旻; born 10 March 1985) is a South Korean former footballer, currently manager of Dangjin Citizen.

On 22 July 2009, Han signed for K-League side Ulsan Hyundai. In 2011, he joined Persema in Liga Primer Indonesia.

On 2021, He appointed by Dangjin Citizen as head coach.

References

External links 

1985 births
Living people
South Korean footballers
South Korean expatriate footballers
South Korean expatriate sportspeople in Indonesia
Expatriate footballers in Indonesia
Suwon Samsung Bluewings players
Ulsan Hyundai FC players
K League 1 players
Korea National League players
Liga 1 (Indonesia) players
Association football midfielders
People from Nonsan